Loongana is a rural locality in the local government area (LGA) of Central Coast in the North-west and west LGA region of Tasmania. The 2016 census recorded a population of 20 for the state suburb of Loongana.

History 
Loongana is a confirmed locality. The name was originally applied to a parish. By 1903 it was in use for the locality. It is believed to be an Aboriginal word for “run swiftly” or similar. 

An alternative source of the name is from a ship which carried rescuers from Melbourne to assist at a mine disaster in 1912.

Geography
The Leven River flows through from west to east and then forms much of the eastern boundary. The Leven Canyon is on this section of the river.

Road infrastructure 
Route C128 (Loongana Road) provides access to the locality.

References

Towns in Tasmania
Localities of Central Coast Council (Tasmania)